John Forsythe (January 29, 1918 – April 1, 2010) was an American stage, film/television actor, producer, narrator, drama teacher and philanthropist whose career spanned six decades. He also appeared as a guest on several talk and variety shows and as a panelist on numerous game shows.

His acting career began in films in 1943. He signed up with Warner Bros. at age 25 as a minor contract player, but he starred in The Captive City (1952) and co-starred opposite Loretta Young in It Happens Every Thursday (1953), Edmund Gwenn and Shirley MacLaine in The Trouble with Harry (1955), and Olivia de Havilland in The Ambassador's Daughter (1956).

He also enjoyed a long successful television career, starring in three television series in three genres: as the single playboy father Bentley Gregg in the sitcom Bachelor Father (1957–1962); as the unseen millionaire Charles Townsend in the crime drama Charlie's Angels (1976–1981)—a role he reprised in the 2000 and 2003 film adaptations; and as patriarch Blake Carrington in Dynasty (1981–1989). He hosted the series World of Survival (1971–1977), and was the presenter of the 38th Miss Universe Pageant, broadcast on CBS in 1989.

Early life
The eldest of three children, Forsythe was born John (or Jacob) Lincoln Freund, on January 29, 1918, in Penns Grove, New Jersey, the son of Blanche Forsythe (née Blohm) and Samuel Jeremiah Freund, a stockbroker. Blanche was born in Georgia to David Hyat Blohm, a Russian Jewish immigrant, and Mary S. Materson, who was born in Maryland to Jewish emigrants from Prussia. Forysthe's father was born in New York to Polish Jewish immigrants. Forsythe was raised in the Jewish faith.

He was raised in Brooklyn, New York, where his father worked as a Wall Street businessman during the Great Depression of the 1930s. He graduated from Abraham Lincoln High School in Brooklyn at the age of 16, and began attending the University of North Carolina at Chapel Hill. In 1936, at the age of 18, he took a job as the public address announcer for Brooklyn Dodgers games at Ebbets Field, confirming a childhood love of baseball. He was a lifelong active Democrat.

Movie career and Army service

Despite showing initial reluctance, Forsythe began an acting career at the suggestion of his father. He met actress Parker Worthington McCormick (December 29, 1918 – July 22, 1980), and the couple married in 1939; they had a son, Dall (born February 14, 1941), and divorced in 1943. As a bit player for Warner Brothers, Forsythe successfully appeared in several small parts.

As a result, he was given a small role in Destination Tokyo (1943). Leaving his movie career for service in the United States Army Air Forces in World War II, he appeared in the USAAF-produced play Winged Victory, then worked with injured soldiers who had developed speech problems.

Also in 1943, Forsythe met Julie Warren, initially a theatre companion, but later a successful actress in her own right, landing a role on Broadway in Around the World. She became Forsythe's second wife, and in the early 1950s they had two daughters.

In 1947, Forsythe joined the initial class of the Actors Studio, where he met Marlon Brando and Julie Harris, among others. During this time he appeared on Broadway in Mister Roberts and The Teahouse of the August Moon. In 1955, Alfred Hitchcock cast him in the movie The Trouble with Harry, with Shirley MacLaine in her first movie appearance, for which she won a Golden Globe. In 1969, Forsythe appeared in another Hitchcock film, Topaz.

Television work

Throughout the 1950s, Forsythe successfully appeared in the new medium and worked regularly on all the networks, especially as a guest star. He appeared in the "Premonition" episode of the popular anthology Alfred Hitchcock Presents, opposite Cloris Leachman.

Forsythe was cast in a 1957 episode, "Decision at Wilson's Creek", on the CBS anthology series Dick Powell's Zane Grey Theatre. He played Confederate Lieutenant David Marr who suddenly resigns to return to his wife, only to find that he is scorned by townspeople.

Outdoor location sequences for the episode were shot on the Iverson Movie Ranch in Chatsworth, California, where a number of scenes took place in a group of oak trees  that later came to be known as the Midway Oaks. One of those oak trees, a distinctive multi-trunked tree with a characteristic lean, became known as the Forsythe Oak, commemorating John Forsythe's appearance at the fabled movie ranch, considered the most widely filmed outdoor location in movie and television history. The Forsythe Oak remains in place today; it is located on a private estate on the former Upper Iverson.

Bachelor Father
In 1957, he took a leading role in the situation comedy Bachelor Father for CBS as Bentley Gregg, a playboy lawyer who has to become a father to his niece Kelly (played by Noreen Corcoran), upon the death of her biological parents. The show was an immediate ratings hit and moved to NBC the following season and to ABC in the fall of 1961. On various episodes Forsythe worked with such up-and-coming actresses as Mary Tyler Moore, Barbara Eden, Donna Douglas, Sally Kellerman, Sue Ane Langdon, and a teenage Linda Evans. During the 1961–1962 season, Bachelor Father was cancelled because of declining ratings.

After Bachelor Father
During the 1960s, Forsythe returned to acting in movies including Kitten with a Whip (1964), Madame X (1966) and In Cold Blood (1967). In 1964 he starred in See How They Run which is notable for being the first film made for television.

He attempted two new television programs: The John Forsythe Show on NBC with Guy Marks, Elsa Lanchester, Ann B. Davis, Peggy Lipton, and Forsythe's two young daughters, Page and Brooke (1965–1966), and To Rome with Love on CBS (1969–1971) with co-star Walter Brennan. Between 1971 and 1977, Forsythe served as narrator on the syndicated nature series, World of Survival. He was also the announcer for Michelob beer commercials during the 1970s and 1980s, notably during the "Weekends were made for Michelob" era.

Charlie's Angels
Forsythe began a 13-year association with Aaron Spelling in 1976, cast in the role of mysterious unseen millionaire private investigator Charles Townsend in the crime drama Charlie's Angels (1976–1981). The show starred Kate Jackson, Jaclyn Smith and Farrah Fawcett, making stars of all three but catapulting Fawcett to iconic status. Forsythe introduces the series' concept during its opening credits:

Forsythe became the highest-paid actor on television on a per-hour basis: while the show's on-camera stars often worked 15-hour days five days a week, with a couple of hours just for hair and makeup, Forsythe's lines for an entire episode would be recorded in a sound studio in a matter of minutes, after which he would have lunch in the network's commissary and then leave for the track. During this period, Forsythe invested much money in Thoroughbred racing, a personal hobby. Gaining respect with the celebrity Thoroughbred circuit, he served on the board of directors at the Hollywood Park Racetrack starting in 1972, and was on the committee for more than 25 years.

Following heart problems, Forsythe underwent quadruple coronary artery bypass surgery in 1979. This was so successful that he not only returned to work on Charlie's Angels, he also appeared in the two-time Academy Award-nominated motion picture ...And Justice for All later that year as Judge Henry T. Fleming, the film's main antagonist, a corrupt judge who despises Al Pacino's lawyer character.

Dynasty
In 1981, nearing the end of Charlie's Angels, Forsythe was selected as a last-minute replacement for George Peppard in the role of conniving patriarch Blake Carrington in Dynasty. Another Spelling production, Dynasty was ABC's answer to the highly successful CBS series Dallas. Between 1985 and 1986, Forsythe also appeared as Blake Carrington in the short-lived spinoff series The Colbys.

The series reunited Forsythe with one-time Bachelor Father guest star Linda Evans, who would play Blake's wife, Krystle. During the run of the series, Forsythe, Evans and co-star Joan Collins, who played Blake's ex-wife Alexis, promoted the Dynasty line of fragrances. Dynasty came to an end in 1989, after nine seasons. Forsythe was the only actor to appear in all 220 episodes.

Forsythe was nominated for Emmy Awards three times between 1982 and 1984 for "Outstanding Lead Actor in a Drama Series" but did not win. He was also nominated six times for Golden Globe Awards, winning twice. He was nominated five times for the Soap Opera Digest Awards, also winning twice. In 1983, Forsythe was presented with the American Academy of Achievement's Golden Plate Award at a ceremony in Coronado, California.

The Powers That Be
In 1992, after a three-year absence, Forsythe returned to series television starring in Norman Lear's situation comedy The Powers That Be for NBC, co-starring Holland Taylor, Peter MacNicol, Valerie Mahaffey and David Hyde Pierce.

Post-1990s work and life

Forsythe's wife of 51 years, Julie Warren (October 20, 1919 – August 15, 1994), died at age 74 from cancer in hospital after Forsythe made the decision to disconnect her life-support system. She had been in a coma following severe breathing difficulties.

In July 2002, Forsythe married businesswoman Nicole Carter (May 27, 1941 – May 11, 2010) at Ballard Country Church; they remained married until his death. Nicole Carter Forsythe died five weeks after her husband.

Forsythe reprised his role as the voice of Charlie for the film version of Charlie's Angels (2000) and its sequel Charlie's Angels: Full Throttle (2003); he then retired from acting.

Besides spending time with his family, he enjoyed ownership of an art gallery. In 2005 actor Bartholomew John portrayed Forsythe in Dynasty: The Making of a Guilty Pleasure, a fictionalized television movie based on the creation and behind the scenes production of Dynasty.

On May 2, 2006, Forsythe appeared with Dynasty co-stars Linda Evans, Joan Collins, Pamela Sue Martin, Al Corley, Gordon Thomson and Catherine Oxenberg in Dynasty Reunion: Catfights & Caviar. The one-hour reunion special of the former ABC series aired on CBS. Forsythe appeared each year to read to children during the annual Christmas program near his home at the rural resort community of Solvang, California.

Forsythe was treated for colorectal cancer in the fall of 2006. Surgery was reportedly successful and his cancer was considered to be in remission at the time of his death.

Death
Forsythe died on April 1, 2010, from pneumonia in Santa Ynez, California. He was interred at Oak Hill Cemetery, Ballard, Santa Barbara County, California.

Thoroughbred racing
Forsythe owned and bred Thoroughbred racehorses for many years and was a member of the board of directors of Hollywood Park Racetrack. Among his successes, in partnership with film producer Martin Ritt he won the 1976 Longacres Mile with Yu Wipi.

With partner Ken Opstein, he won the 1982 Sixty Sails Handicap with Targa, and the 1993 La Brea Stakes with a daughter of Targa, Mamselle Bebette, which he raced under the name of his Big Train Farm, a stable he named for Hall of Fame baseball pitcher, Walter Johnson.

In the 1980s, Forsythe served as the regular host for the annual Eclipse Awards. He was the recipient of the 1988 Eclipse Award of Merit for his contribution in promoting the sport of Thoroughbred racing.

Filmography

Films

Television

Web

Radio appearances

References

External links 

 
 
 Official site
  (2000)
 The Forsythe Oak on the Iverson Movie Ranch
 Iverson Movie Ranch: History, vintage photos.

1918 births
2010 deaths
20th-century American male actors
21st-century American male actors
Abraham Lincoln High School (Brooklyn) alumni
American male film actors
American male stage actors
American male television actors
American male voice actors
American racehorse owners and breeders
Best Drama Actor Golden Globe (television) winners
California Democrats
Deaths from pneumonia in California
Eclipse Award winners
Jewish American male actors
Male actors from New Jersey
New Jersey Democrats
New York (state) Democrats
People from Brooklyn
People from Penns Grove, New Jersey
Television producers from New York City
United States Army Air Forces personnel of World War II
University of North Carolina at Chapel Hill alumni
21st-century American Jews
Television producers from New Jersey